Susan Catherine O'Regan (born ) is a New Zealand politician serving as the mayor of Waipa since 2022.

Early life
O'Regan was born and raised in Rukuhia. Her mother was Katherine O'Regan, a National MP who represented . She boarded at Waikato Diocesan School in Hamilton and King's College in Auckland, and later graduated from the University of Otago with a Bachelor of Laws and Bachelor of Arts. She briefly worked for Murray McCully as a ministerial assistant in parliament before starting a legal career in Auckland, being admitted to the bar in 1996. After marrying a farmer, she ended her legal career in 2010 to focus on family and farming. Their farm, Judge Valley Dairies, has won multiple awards at the Waikato Farm Environment Awards.

Political career
O'Regan was asked to run for the Taranaki-King Country electorate in the  after Shane Ardern announced his retirement, but she turned it down after becoming pregnant. In 2016, she was elected to the Kakepuku ward of the Waipa District Council. She was re-elected unopposed in 2019 and chaired the council's Strategic Planning and Policy Committee.

In April 2022, O'Regan announced that despite speculation that she would run for mayor like her mother had in 1995, she was retiring from politics to work for DairyNZ. She also ruled out contesting the parliamentary by-election for Tauranga, an electorate her mother had unsuccessfully run for twice after her own Waipa seat was abolished. However in June she changed her mind, staking her political career on an "all or nothing" campaign for mayor. In October, she defeated the incumbent Jim Mylchreest, becoming the first female mayor of the district and the first to oust an incumbent.

References

1970s births
Living people
Women mayors of places in New Zealand
Mayors of Waipa
People educated at Waikato Diocesan School
People educated at King's College, Auckland
University of Otago alumni
New Zealand farmers
New Zealand women farmers